Stepnovsky is a rural locality (a settlement) and the administrative center of Stepnovskoye Rural Settlement, Nikolayevsky District, Volgograd Oblast, Russia. The population was 1,146 as of 2010. There are 19 streets.

Geography 
Stepnovsky is located on the Transvolga, on Caspian Depression, 46 km southeast of Nikolayevsk (the district's administrative centre) by road. Put Ilyicha is the nearest rural locality.

References 

Rural localities in Nikolayevsky District, Volgograd Oblast